Claire Roche is a singer harpist based in Co. Dublin, Ireland. She plays the concert harp as well as the Irish harp. Roche has performed as an opening artist for The Chieftains and The Fureys and has performed at venues including The Florida Folk Festival in White Springs, Florida, and at Stephen Foster Memorial Park, on the banks of the Suwannee River in the Southern United States and at Old Government House, Parramatta in Australia.

Recordings
Dancing in the Wind:  poetry of W.B. Yeats set to music
Lilt of the Banshee:  traditional Irish, Welsh and English songs, tunes and poetry set to music
Songs of Love & Loss: haunting originals
Out of the Ordinary
An Irish Wedding Ceremony

References

External links
Official website

Year of birth missing (living people)
Living people
Irish women singers
Irish harpists
Musicians from County Dublin